Western Flyer was an American country music band founded in 1992 by Danny Myrick (lead vocals, bass guitar), Chris Marion (keyboards, vocals), T. J. Klay (harmonica, mandolin, vocals), Bruce Gust (drums, vocals), Steve Charles (lead guitar, vocals), and Roger Helton (acoustic guitar, banjo, vocals). The band released two albums for Step One Records, as well as six singles. Their highest peaking single is "What Will You Do with M-E?", which reached No. 32 on the Billboard country charts in 1996. After Western Flyer disbanded, Marion joined the Little River Band, and Myrick began writing songs for other artists.

History
Western Flyer was founded in 1992 by lead singer and bass guitarist Danny Myrick and keyboardist Chris Marion. Completing the lineup were harmonicist/mandolinist T.J. Klay, drummer Bruce Gust, lead guitarist Steve Charles, and guitarist/banjoist Roger Helton. The band members met in Nashville at a church where some of them had been playing in the church band.  The band took the name Western Flyer from a brand of bicycle.

The group signed to the independent Step One Records label in 1993, and released a self-titled debut album a year later. This album accounted for five chart singles, of which four reached the lower regions of the Billboard country charts. The album's third release, "Cherokee Highway", did not chart in the U.S., although it was a Top 40 hit on the RPM Country Tracks charts and received media attention for its story of interracial violence.

Western Flyer's second album, 1996's Back in America, produced its highest charting single in "What Will You Do with M-E?" which reached No. 32 on the U.S. country charts. Also included on this album were "She Wants to Be Wanted Again," which Ty Herndon also released on his 1996 album Living in a Moment and released as a single in 1997, and "Lost in You", which received a "Critic's Choice" review in Billboard. Back in America produced no other chart singles, and Western Flyer disbanded in 1997. Marion subsequently joined the Little River Band, a rock group, in 2004. Danny Myrick signed to a songwriting contract with 3 Ring Circus Music, which is owned by Jeffrey Steele. Myrick has co-written "International Harvester" for Craig Morgan, "Loud" for Big & Rich, the Number One hit "She's Country" for Jason Aldean, and "How Far Do You Wanna Go?" by Gloriana.

Western Flyer (1994)

Track listing
"Western Flyer" (Danny Myrick, Tony Wood) – 3:53
"She Should've Been Mine" (Kent Blazy, Jim Dowell, Rob Crosby) – 3:41
"His Memory" (Donny Kees, Richard Ross) – 3:20
"Cherokee Highway" (Myrick, Wood) – 4:45
"I Would Give Anything" (Roger Ball) – 3:10
"Friday Night Stampede" (Marcus Hummon, Monty Powell) – 3:07
"Liar's Moon" (Myrick, Don Pfrimmer, Philip Douglas) – 2:41
"A Hundred Others Like It" (Myrick, Wood) – 2:45
"The One Who Understands" (Greg Barnhill, Richard Bach) – 3:43
"Pathway to the Moon"  (Hummon, Michael Puryear) – 3:43

Personnel

Western Flyer
Steve Charles- electric guitar, background vocals
Bruce Gust- drums, percussion, background vocals
Roger Helton- banjo, fiddle, acoustic guitar, background vocals
T.J. Klay- acoustic guitar, harmonica, mandolin, background vocals
Chris Marion- keyboards, background vocals
Danny Myrick- bass guitar, lead vocals

Additional musicians
Cory Hutchinson- background vocals
Steve Mauldin- string arrangements
Kris Wilkinson- strings

Back in America (1996)

Track listing
"Back in America" (Layng Martine, Jr.) – 3:52
"Lost in You" (Bryan Smith) – 3:36
"Wish You Were Here" (Bob Dellaposta) – 3:54
"Surrender" (Joe Diffie, Kent Blazy, Lonnie Wilson) – 2:52
"I Know Where You're Coming From" (Jerry Taylor, Ashe Underwood) – 3:41
"What Will You Do with M-E?" (Craig Martin, Rick Tiger) – 4:38
"New Tin Roof" (Chapin Hartford, Jeff Moseley) – 3:11
"She Wants to Be Wanted Again" (Billy Henderson, Steven Dale Jones) – 4:09
"Less Than a Minute" (Tommy Barnes) – 3:15
"Black and Blue" (Danny Myrick, Tony Wood) – 3:05
"Rhythm of the Highway" (Myrick, Wood) – 4:17
"Sixteen Tons" (Merle Travis) – 8:14

Personnel

Western Flyer
Steve Charles- electric guitar, background vocals
Bruce Gust- drums, percussion, background vocals
Roger Helton- banjo, fiddle, acoustic guitar, background vocals
T.J. Klay- acoustic guitar, harmonica, mandolin, background vocals
Chris Marion- keyboards, piano, background vocals
Danny Myrick- lead vocals

Additional Musicians
Bobby All- acoustic guitar
Kelly Back- electric guitar
Buddy Emmons- steel guitar
Aubrey Haynie- fiddle
Dirk Johnson- keyboards, piano
Jerry Kroon- drums
Gary Prim- keyboards, piano
W. David Smith- bass guitar
Kevin Williams- acoustic guitar

Singles

notes

Music videos

References

External links
 Official TJ Klay website
 Official Bruce Gust website
 Official Steve Charles website

Country music groups from Tennessee
Musical groups from Nashville, Tennessee
Musical groups established in 1992
Musical groups disestablished in 1997
Step One Records artists